The Richmond, Fredericksburg, and Potomac Railroad  was a railroad connecting Richmond, Virginia, to Washington, D.C. The track is now the RF&P Subdivision of the CSX Transportation system; the original corporation is no longer a railroad company.

The RF&P was a bridge line, with a slogan of "Linking North & South," on a system that stretched about 113 miles. Until around 1965, RF&P originated less than 5% of its freight tonnage, probably less than any other Class I railroad. For much of its existence, the RF&P connected with the Chesapeake and Ohio Railway, the Atlantic Coast Line Railroad and Seaboard Air Line Railroad at Richmond. At Alexandria and through trackage rights to Union Station in Washington, D.C., connections were made with the Pennsylvania Railroad, Baltimore and Ohio Railroad and the Southern Railway. It connected to the Washington and Old Dominion Railroad at Potomac Yard and interchanged with the Chesapeake and Ohio Railway at Doswell. It and the former Conrail properties are the only CSX lines to have cab signal requirements on their entire system.

History

The Richmond, Fredericksburg and Potomac Railroad was chartered on February 25, 1834, to run from Richmond north via Fredericksburg to the Potomac River. It opened from Richmond to Hazel Run in 1836, to Fredericksburg on January 23, 1837, and the rest of the way to the Potomac River at Aquia Creek on September 30, 1842. Steamboat service to Washington, D.C., and the Baltimore & Ohio Railroad was provided by the Washington and Fredericksburg Steamboat Company, later renamed the Potomac Steamboat Company, controlled by the railroad after 1845.

Badly damaged during the Civil War, on October 11, 1870, an extension to the north toward Quantico was authorized at a special meeting of the company's stockholders. The company's charter limited this branch to 10 miles, leaving it 1.7 miles short of the Alexandria and Fredericksburg Railroad. This split from the existing line at Brooke and ran north to Quantico, also on the Potomac. The old line to the Aquia Creek wharf was abandoned on the opening of the Quantico wharf on May 1, 1872.

On the other end of the line, the Alexandria and Washington Railroad was chartered on February 27, 1854, to build from the south end of the Long Bridge over the Potomac River south to Alexandria. That line opened in 1857. The railroad went bankrupt and was sold July 9, 1887, being reorganized November 23, 1887, as the Alexandria and Washington Railway. In 1873 the Baltimore and Potomac Railroad's branch over the Long Bridge opened, giving a route into Washington, D.C., over which the A&W obtained trackage rights.

The Alexandria and Fredericksburg Railway was chartered February 3, 1864, to continue the line from Alexandria to Fredericksburg. It opened on July 2, 1872, only reaching Quantico, the north end of the RF&P. At Quantico the 1.7-mile (2.7 km) Potomac Railroad, chartered April 21, 1867, and opened May 1, 1872, connected the two lines. It was leased to the RF&P for 28 years from May 17, 1877. On March 31, 1890, the two companies terminating in Alexandria merged to form the Washington Southern Railway. Until November 1, 1901, it was operated by the Baltimore and Potomac Railroad and its successor the Philadelphia, Baltimore and Washington Railroad (part of the Pennsylvania Railroad system). The Potomac Railroad lease was transferred to the Washington Southern on June 30, 1904. On February 24, 1920, the Washington Southern was formally merged into the RF&P.

The Richmond-Washington Company was incorporated September 5, 1901, as a holding company, owning the entire capital stock of the two railroads. The stock of the company was owned equally by the Pennsylvania Railroad, Baltimore and Ohio Railroad, Atlantic Coast Line Railroad, Southern Railway, Seaboard Air Line Railway and Chesapeake and Ohio Railway. Four of these companies (B&O, ACL, SAL, C&O) have since become part of CSX. The Southern Railway is now part of Norfolk Southern and does not use the former RF&P; the former Pennsylvania Railroad, in its later incarnation as Conrail, has been split between CSX and Norfolk Southern with most of PRR's routes becoming part of Norfolk Southern. However, the portion of the former PRR that connected to the very north of the RF&P's former Potomac Yard, across the Long Bridge and into Washington DC, became part of CSX following the takeover of Conrail by NS and CSX. The RF&P company became Commonwealth Atlantic Land V Inc., and a new corporation, named the Richmond, Fredericksburg & Potomac Railway Company, was formed on October 9, 1991.

On December 31, 1925, RF&P operated 118 miles of road and 432 miles of track; on December 31, 1970, mileages were 118 and 518.

Passenger service 

As the link between "North and South" the RF&P primarily hosted the trains of other railroads, particularly those on the lucrative New York–Florida run. In March 1950 this included the East Coast Champion, West Coast Champion, Miamian, Palmland, Silver Star, Silver Comet, Orange Blossom Special, Silver Meteor, Vacationer, Havana Special, Palmetto, Florida Special, Cotton Blossom, Sunland, and Everglades.

The RF&P operated comparatively few trains of its own. One was the Old Dominion, a streamliner inaugurated in 1947 between Washington and Richmond. This train used four 70-seat coaches and a cafe-parlor car, all built by American Car and Foundry. In 1956, the RF&P operated two daily passenger trains, one of which was a local and the other an express in addition to operating numerous through trains from other railroads.

Branches

Richmond Connection
The Richmond, Fredericksburg and Potomac and Richmond and Petersburg Railroad Connection was chartered March 3, 1866, and opened May 1, 1867, as a connection between the RF&P and the Richmond and Petersburg Railroad (later part of the Atlantic Coast Line Railroad) west of downtown Richmond. It was operated jointly by those two companies. In addition, a downtown connection was owned by the R&P past Broad Street Station.

Louisa
The Louisa Railroad was chartered in 1836, running from the RF&P at Doswell west to Louisa. At first it was operated as a branch of the RF&P, but it was reorganized as the Virginia Central Railroad in 1850 and merged into the Chesapeake and Ohio Railroad in 1868 as its oldest predecessor.

Rosslyn
In 1896, the Washington Southern Railway opened a  branch that connected the south end of the Long Bridge in Jackson City to the south end of the Aqueduct Bridge in Rosslyn. The Railway built much of the branch within the grade of the old disused Alexandria Canal.

In 1904, the Rosslyn Connecting Railroad, which the Philadelphia, Baltimore and Washington Railroad controlled, acquired the branch on the same day (February 29) that the railroad was incorporated in accordance with Virginia law. The Rosslyn Connecting Railroad abandoned nearly all of its line in 1962 and closed in 1969 after operating for 65 years.

In 1977, the Washington Metropolitan Area Transit Authority opened a surface-level section of Metrorail's Blue Line that replaced most of the section of the Rosslyn Connecting Railroad's line that had traveled within the Alexandria Canal's grade. The section of the Blue Line parallels Virginia State Route 110 where passing Arlington National Cemetery.

Station listing

Footnotes

References

External links

Richmond, Fredericksburg & Potomac Railroad Historical Society, Inc.
Pictures and information on the Richmond, Fredericksburg & Potomac Railroad
Richmond, Fredericksburg & Potomac (TrainWeb)
Railroad History Database
Corporate Genealogy - Richmond, Fredericksburg and Potomac
Corporate Genealogy - Washington Southern
Mileposts from CSX Transportation Timetables

 
Defunct Washington, D.C., railroads
Defunct Virginia railroads
Atlantic Coast Line Railroad
Southern Railway (U.S.)
Seaboard Air Line Railroad
Chesapeake and Ohio Railway
Predecessors of CSX Transportation
Former Class I railroads in the United States
Standard gauge railways in the United States
Transportation in Arlington County, Virginia
Companies affiliated with the Pennsylvania Railroad
Companies affiliated with the Baltimore and Ohio Railroad
Railway companies established in 1834
Railway companies disestablished in 1991
1834 establishments in Virginia
1991 disestablishments in the United States
American companies established in 1834